The 2011 Leinster Senior Cup, was the 110th staging of the Leinster Senior Cup association football competition. 43 teams entered the 2011 competition including the 11 League of Ireland teams affiliated to the Leinster Football Association who entered the competition at the Fourth round stage. A further 16 Intermediate teams, 14 Junior teams and 2 A Championship sides entered the competition at the First round stage. St.Patrick's Athletic won the competition after beating Bohemians 2-0 at Dalymount Park.

Third round

The draw for the third round took place on 20 January 2011.

Fourth round

The draw for the Fourth round took place on 20 January 2011.

Bohemians advance to the quarter-final stage following Sporting Fingal ceasing operations on 10 February 2011

Quarter-finals

The draw for the quarter-finals took place on 16 March 2011.

Semi-finals
The Draw for the semi-finals took place on 11 July 2011

Final

References

External links
 Official website

Leinster Senior Cup (association football)
4